Irina Gorovaia (born June 13, 1989), also credited as Irene Gorovaia, is an American actress and dancer.

Early life 
Irina Gorovaia was born on June 13, 1989, in St. Petersburg, Russia. She was raised in Brooklyn, New York. She has been a ballet dancer for many years, training with the School of American Ballet. Gorovaia also studied drama at LaGuardia Arts High School. She performed in The Nutcracker with the New York City Ballet in 2000.

Career 
She began her film career in Touchstone Pictures' The Royal Tenenbaums (2001), in the role of Young Margot Tenenbaum, for which she was nominated for a Young Artist Award for Best Performance in a Feature Film, Supporting Young Actress in 2002. Gorovaia was subsequently cast in films It Runs in the Family (2003) and The Butterfly Effect (2004). In 2016, she won Best Supporting Actress for her role in After the Outbreak at The Endless Mountain Film Festival and was nominated for Best Actress at The Nice International Film Festival in 2017.

Filmography

References

External links

1989 births
Russian emigrants to the United States
American ballerinas
American child actresses
American film actresses
Living people
21st-century American actresses
Actresses from New York City
People from Brooklyn
New York City Ballet dancers
School of American Ballet alumni